The 1992 Wellington Central by-election was a by-election held in the  electorate during the 43rd New Zealand Parliament, on 12 December 1992. It was caused by the resignation of incumbent MP Fran Wilde after her election as mayor of Wellington and was won by Chris Laidlaw with a majority of 855.

Background and candidates

Labour
Although Labour were gaining ground in opinion polls, the party was cautious on the heels of the recent Tamaki by-election where their candidate finished a distant third. Leader Mike Moore said that the quality of the candidates would be "absolutely crucial" to deciding the outcome.

Past President of the Public Service Association, Sue Piper contemplated standing. Former All Black Chris Laidlaw expressed his interest in standing for the seat immediately. He then held the position of New Zealand's Race Relations Conciliator.

National
National's candidate from the 1990 general election Pauline Gardiner (who lost by only 246 votes) announced she intended to stand again for the seat. The other nomination for the National candidacy was British-born Barbara Stones, a nursing lecturer at Wellington Polytechnic Another ex-All Black, David Kirk, was approached by National to stand for the seat, though he declined nomination. Wellington City Councillor Rex Nicholls, who regained a seat on the council in 1992 after failing to win the Mayoralty in 1989, also considered standing.

Alliance
The Green Party candidate from the previous election, Stephen Rainbow said he would not contest the seat again as he was opposed to the Green Party's decision to join the Alliance. As the Green Party vote was significantly higher than both NewLabour and the Democrat parties combined, a Green candidate was viewed as the Alliance's best route to gaining the seat.

Green Party city councillor Sue Kedgley was approached to stand, but she declined. Karen Roper, a policy manager at the Public Service Association was also contacted for nomination. She had previously contested the Wellington Central seat in the 1978 general election for the Values Party. Another former Values Party candidate, Denis Welch was ultimately chosen as the Alliance candidate. Welch contested , also in the 1978 general election.

Previous election

Results
The following table gives the election results:

1 Alliance vote change from 3,817 combined vote for Green Party, NewLabour and Democrats in 1990 election.

2 Based on 1990 election figures.

See also
1992 Wellington City mayoral election

Notes

References

Wellington Central 1992
Wellington Central
1990s in Wellington
Events in Wellington
December 1992 events in New Zealand
Politics of the Wellington Region